Beğendik (former Ayostefano)  is a village in Demirköy district of Kırklareli Province, Turkey.

History

Trivia
The name of the village Beğendik means "We liked it". According to tradition the village was in ruins. A high ranking man had visited the village and ordered to reconstruct it. Later during his second visit, the villagers asked his impression about the renewed village and the man said Beğendik ("We liked it").

References

Villages in Demirköy District